Arthur Joseph Giroux (June 6, 1908 – June 5, 1982) was a Canadian professional ice hockey right winger who played three seasons in the National Hockey League for the Montreal Canadiens, Detroit Red Wings and Boston Bruins between 1932 and 1936. Giroux was included on Detroit's 1936 team picture, but left off the Stanley Cup. He spent most of the season in the minors, and did not play in the NHL during the playoffs. Giroux also played several seasons in various minor leagues during his career, which lasted from 1926 to 1945.

Career statistics

Regular season and playoffs

External links

1908 births
1974 deaths
Boston Bruins players
Boston Tigers (CAHL) players
Canadian expatriate ice hockey players in the United States
Canadian ice hockey right wingers
Cleveland Barons (1937–1973) players
Detroit Olympics (IHL) players
Detroit Red Wings players
Franco-Manitoban people
Montreal Canadiens players
Pittsburgh Hornets players
Providence Reds players
St. Louis Flyers players
Ice hockey people from Winnipeg
Stanley Cup champions